Schizotricha is a genus of cnidarians belonging to the monotypic family Schizotrichidae.

The genus has almost cosmopolitan distribution.

Species

Species:

Schizotricha anderssoni 
Schizotricha auroraaustralis 
Schizotricha catharina

References

Plumularioidea
Hydrozoan genera